Papineau Avenue (officially in ) is the longest north–south street in Montreal, Quebec, Canada. The part of the street between Henri Bourassa Boulevard and Quebec Autoroute 40 is the Montreal portion of Quebec Autoroute 19, commonly referred to as Autoroute Papineau. North of Henri Bourassa Boulevard, it becomes a true autoroute before crossing the Rivière des Prairies on the Papineau-Leblanc Bridge. In the south, the avenue ends at Notre-Dame Street.

It traverses the boroughs of Ville-Marie, Le Plateau-Mont-Royal, Rosemont–La Petite-Patrie, Villeray-St-Michel-Parc-Extension and Ahuntsic-Cartierville.

The street is named after Joseph Papineau, Lower Canadian politician and father of Louis-Joseph Papineau, the leader of the reformist Patriote movement and belligerent in the Lower Canada Rebellion of 1837.

Transportation
The street is served by the Papineau Montreal Metro station which is located one block east on Saint Catherine Street. The Fabre metro station also has an entrance to Papineau, on the adjacent Jean-Talon Street.

The street is also served by three STM bus routes. The 45 Papineau 
 serves the street during the daytime, the 445 Papineau on weekdays and the 359 Papineau 
 serves the street at night.

References 

Streets in Montreal
Centre-Sud
Le Plateau-Mont-Royal
Rosemont–La Petite-Patrie
Villeray–Saint-Michel–Parc-Extension
Ahuntsic-Cartierville